A total lunar eclipse occurred on 28 August 2007, lasting just over 90 minutes. The Moon entered the Earth's penumbra at 7:53:40 UTC.  The first partial phase began in earnest at 8:51:16 UTC when the Moon entered the Earth's umbra. It exited the penumbra at 13:20:57 UTC.

It is a relatively rare central eclipse where the moon passes in front of the center of the Earth's shadow. It was the last central lunar eclipse of Saros series 128 as well as the "longest and deepest lunar eclipse to be seen in 7 years". In the total lunar eclipse of 16 July 2000 the moon passed within two arc minutes of the center of the Earth's shadow. In comparison, this still very deep eclipse was off-center by over 12 minutes of arc. The next total lunar eclipse of a longer duration was on 15 June 2011.

The lunar eclipse was the second one in 2007. The first one occurred on 3 March 2007.

Viewing 

Viewing from Oceania is favoured for the eclipse, because at the moment of greatest eclipse (10:37:22 UTC), the Moon was at the zenith of French Polynesia.  The Pacific regions of Canada and the continental United States (including all of Alaska) witnessed the whole event, along with most of eastern Australia, New Zealand and all the Pacific Island regions (except New Guinea), and the tip of the Chukchi Peninsula that includes the town of Uelen, Russia.  The majority of the Americas observed an abbreviated eclipse, with moonset occurring at some time during the eclipse.  Siberia, far eastern Russia, eastern South Asia, China, the rest of eastern and southeastern Asia, New Guinea, and the rest of Australia missed out on the beginning of the eclipse, because the eclipse occurred at or close to moonrise in those regions.

Luzon (except Visayas and Mindanao) in the Philippines, particularly Metro Manila, missed the rare eclipse entirely, due to clouds in the area due to the rainy season, which saddened many eclipse watchers in the area, but the eclipse was sighted by other amateur astronomers in other parts of the country as the lunar eclipse seen in clear skies. The eclipse was also missed in New Guinea, especially Port Moresby because of clouds.  Greenland, Europe (including western Russia), Africa, western Asia, western Central Asia, and western South Asia missed the eclipse completely.

Map

Relation to other lunar eclipses

Eclipses of 2007 
 A total lunar eclipse on 3 March.
 A partial solar eclipse on 19 March.
 A total lunar eclipse on 28 August.
 A partial solar eclipse on 11 September.

This eclipse at the moon's ascending node was the second of two lunar eclipses to occur in 2007. The first at the descending node was on 3 March 2007.

Lunar year series

Metonic cycle (19 years)

Saros series 

Lunar Saros 128 contains 15 total lunar eclipses between 1845 and 2097 (in years 1845, 1863, 1881, 1899, 1917, 1935, 1953, 1971, 1989, 2007, 2025, 2043, 2061, 2079 and 2097). Solar Saros 135 interleaves with this lunar saros with an event occurring every 9 years 5 days alternating between each saros series.

Half-Saros cycle
A lunar eclipse will be preceded and followed by solar eclipses by 9 years and 5.5 days (a half saros). This lunar eclipse is related to two annular solar eclipses of Solar Saros 135.

Photo gallery

See also 
List of lunar eclipses and List of 21st-century lunar eclipses
 :File:2007-08-28 Lunar Eclipse Sketch.gif Chart

Notes

External links

 NASA, Eclipses of 2007
 
 NASA Saros series 128
 Hermit eclipse: Total lunar eclipse: August 28, 2007
 Astronomy magazine: August 23, 2007 central total eclipse
 Photos
 APOD: August 30 2007
 Lunar Eclipse Gallery: 28aug07
 Video of eclipse
 http://www.starrynightphotos.com/moon/lunar_eclipse_august_2007.htm
 https://web.archive.org/web/20100114175256/http://echeng.com/journal/images/misc/echeng-full-lunar-eclipse.jpg

2007-08
2007-08
2007 in science
August 2007 events